Jin'an (Foochow Romanized: Céng-ăng) is one of 6 urban districts of the prefecture-level city of Fuzhou, the capital of Fujian Province, China.

Administrative divisions
Subdistricts:
Chayuan Subdistrict, Wangzhuang Subdistrict, Xiangyuan Subdistrict

Towns:
Yuefeng, Gushan, Xindian, Huanxi

Townships:
Shoushan Township, Rixi Township

References

County-level divisions of Fujian
Fuzhou